IIW may refer to:

It Is Written
Independent Iron Works
International Institute of Welding